Sandusky station is an Amtrak station in Sandusky, Ohio. Located at 1200 North Depot Street, the station consists of an uncovered platform on the north side of the east–west tracks, a small parking lot, and two buildings.  The former Railway Express Agency/baggage building is boarded up, while the main building has a small, remodeled waiting room for Amtrak passengers as well as offices for the Sandusky Transit System and North Central EMS.

The Sandusky station was originally built in 1892 by the Lake Shore and Michigan Southern Railway. It was designed by architects Shepley, Rutan & Coolidge and was also a work of A. Feick & Bros., and was listed on the National Register of Historic Places in 1975. In the heyday of passenger train travel in the first six decades of the 20th century the station was a local stop, bypassed by most New York Central named trains on the Chicago-New York City circuit. Exceptions were the Iroquois and the Chicagoan'''s eastbound trip. Additionally, the Cleveland-Detroit Cleveland Mercury made a stop at Sandusky. Passenger services ended in 1971, but were reinstated on July 29, 1979 when Amtrak added it as a stop on the Lake Shore Limited.

The station is served by the Capitol Limited and Lake Shore Limited'' routes, both of which pass through Sandusky in the middle of the night.  Because the station consists of only one platform, eastbound trains switch to the usual westbound tracks to pass the station.

References

External links 

Sandusky Amtrak Station (USA Rail Guide -- Train Web)

Amtrak stations in Ohio
Buildings and structures in Sandusky, Ohio
Transportation in Erie County, Ohio
National Register of Historic Places in Erie County, Ohio
Former New York Central Railroad stations
Railway stations in the United States opened in 1892
1892 establishments in Ohio
Railway stations closed in 1971
Railway stations in the United States opened in 1979
Railway stations on the National Register of Historic Places in Ohio